The United States Air Force Locomotive No. 1246 is a historic diesel-electric railroad switch locomotive on display at the Fort Smith Trolley Museum in Fort Smith, Arkansas.  It was manufactured in 1953 by the General Electric Company in Schenectady, New York, in fulfillment of a contract with the United States Air Force for eleven of its 44-ton locomotives.  It is believed to have spent all of its productive life at Grissom Air Force Base in Indiana, and was acquired by the museum in 1992.

The locomotive was added to the National Register of Historic Places in 2006.

See also
National Register of Historic Places listings in Sebastian County, Arkansas

References

Railway locomotives on the National Register of Historic Places in Arkansas
Buildings and structures in Fort Smith, Arkansas
Railway locomotives introduced in 1953
Individual locomotives of the United States
Standard gauge locomotives of the United States
National Register of Historic Places in Sebastian County, Arkansas
B-B locomotives
Preserved diesel locomotives
General Electric locomotives